Bebearia brunhilda is a butterfly in the family Nymphalidae. It is found in Cameroon, the Democratic Republic of the Congo, Uganda and possibly Tanzania.

Subspecies
Bebearia brunhilda brunhilda (Cameroon, Democratic Republic of the Congo, western Uganda)
Bebearia brunhilda iturina (Karsch, 1894) (north-eastern Democratic Republic of the Congo, western Uganda)
Bebearia brunhilda sankuruensis Hecq, 1989 (Democratic Republic of the Congo: Sankuru)

References

Butterflies described in 1889
brunhilda
Butterflies of Africa
Taxa named by William Forsell Kirby